Smoke testing may refer to:

 Smoke testing (electrical) looking for smoke when powering electrical items for the first time
 Smoke testing (mechanical) the practice of using smoke to test for leaks
 Smoke testing (software) trying the major functions of software before carrying out formal testing
 Smoke testing (lean startup) testing for market demand of a value proposition prior to building a functioning product or service
 Smoke testing, with theatrical smoke and fog
 Testing smoke detectors with artificial smoke